Gabriel Zwilling, also known as Gabriel Didymus (c. 1487 – 1 May 1558), was a German Lutheran and Protestant Reformer born near Annaberg, Electorate of Saxony. He was educated in Wittenberg and Erfurt. 
He, like Martin Luther, was a member of the Augustinian order, which he left in 1521.

Zwilling became prominent in the Wittenberg Movement in mid-1521, when Luther was secured in the Wartburg after the Diet of Worms. Along with Andreas Karlstadt, Zwilling guided the Wittenberg movement in a more radical direction. In January 1522 he participated in iconoclasm in Wittenberg.

When Luther returned to Wittenberg and regained control in March 1522, Zwilling publicly admitted his errors, and gave his support to Luther's more conservative vision of reform. 
He became a prediger (“preacher”) in Altenburg in 1522, and moved to Torgau in 1523 where he became successively prediger, pastor (1525), and superintendent (1529). 
He married the widow of the former councilor and chancellor of Frederick III, Hieronymus Rudelauf (about 1450-1523) from Frankenberg. The couple had a son, Paul Zwilling (1547-1581). He was removed from his final office because he opposed the Leipzig Interim of 1549. Zwilling died in Torgau.

References 

1480s births
1558 deaths
Year of birth uncertain
People from Annaberg-Buchholz
Augustinian friars
German Lutherans
People from the Electorate of Saxony
German Protestant Reformers
University of Wittenberg alumni
University of Erfurt alumni